Lucas Ariel Menossi (born 20 July 1992) is an Argentine footballer who plays for Tigre.

References

External links
 
 
 

Argentine footballers
1992 births
Living people
Club Atlético Tigre footballers
San Lorenzo de Almagro footballers
Argentine Primera División players
Association football midfielders
Sportspeople from Buenos Aires Province
Argentine people of Italian descent